The Jebel Barkal Museum is an archaeological site museum located on the eastern side of the archeological area of Jebel Barkal at Karima in the Northern State of Sudan.

Displays

The three gallery rooms of the museum display artefacts and pottery findings from excavations conducted in the Jebel Barkal area, among them one of the royal Twenty-fifth Dynasty of Egypt statues found by George A. Reisner in 1916.

References

Museums in Sudan
Archaeological museums
History of Nubia
Kingdom of Kush